Western Express Air was a regional airline in Bullhead City, Arizona that is owned and operated by Falcon Executive Aviation. It discontinued all scheduled operations at the end of May 2007.

Destinations
 Arizona
 Bullhead City (Bullhead City International Airport) Hub
 Mesa (Falcon Field) (discontinued January 2007)
 Phoenix (Phoenix Deer Valley Airport)
 California
 Riverside (Riverside Municipal Airport)

Fleet
 Cessna 208 Grand Caravan

See also 
 List of defunct airlines of the United States

References

External links 
 Western Express Air (official site)

Defunct airlines of the United States
Transportation in Mohave County, Arizona
Defunct companies based in Arizona
Airlines disestablished in 2007